Skrad is a municipality in the Primorje-Gorski Kotar County in western Croatia. There are 1,062 inhabitants, with 97% Croats (2011).

See also
Zeleni Vir Hydroelectric Power Plant

References

Municipalities of Croatia
Populated places in Primorje-Gorski Kotar County